This is the complete list of men's World Aquatics Championships medalists in swimming from 1973 to 2022.

Medalists
Bold numbers in brackets denotes record number of victories in corresponding disciplines.

50 metre freestyle

Medals:

100 metre freestyle

Medals:

200 metre freestyle

Medals:

400 metre freestyle

Medals:

800 metre freestyle

Medals:

1500 metre freestyle

Medals:

50 metre backstroke

Medals:

100 metre backstroke

Medals:

200 metre backstroke

Medals:

50 metre breaststroke

Medals:

100 metre breaststroke

Medals:

200 metre breaststroke

Medals:

50 metre butterfly

Medals:

100 metre butterfly

Medals:

200 metre butterfly

Medals:

200 metre individual medley

Medals:

400 metre individual medley

Medals:

4 × 100 metre freestyle relay

* Swimmers who participated in the heats only.

Medals:

4 × 200 metre freestyle relay

* Swimmers who participated in the heats only.

Medals:

4 × 100 metre medley relay

* Swimmers who participated in the heats only.

Medals:

4 × 100 metre mixed freestyle relay

* Swimmers who participated in the heats only.

Medals:

4 × 100 metre mixed medley relay

* Swimmers who participated in the heats only.

Medals:

All-time medal table 1973–2022
Updated after the 2022 World Aquatics Championships.

Men's events

Mixed events

Multiple medalists
Boldface denotes active swimmers and highest medal count among all swimmers (including these who not included in these tables) per type.

All events

* including one medal in the relay event in which he participated in the heats only  
** including two medals in the relay events in which he participated in the heats only

Individual events

See also
 List of World Aquatics Championships medalists in swimming (women)
 List of World Aquatics Championships medalists in open water swimming
 List of individual gold medalists in swimming at the Olympics and World Aquatics Championships (men)
 List of gold medalist relay teams in swimming at the Olympics and World Aquatics Championships
 List of Olympic medalists in swimming (men)

References

External links
HistoFINA Swimming Medallists And Statistics At FINA World Championships (50m), December 3, 2015

World Aquatics Championships (men)

World Aquatics Championships
Swimming
medalists